Mary Dagen McDowell (born January 7, 1969) is an American anchor and co-host of The Bottom Line on Fox Business as well as a commentator and guest host on Fox News.

Education
A native of Campbell County, Virginia, from a family of Irish background, McDowell graduated from Wake Forest University with a degree in Art history.

Career 
McDowell began her career as a financial journalist at the Institutional Investor'''s Newsletter Division.

 Fox News 
McDowell co-hosted Mornings with Maria on Fox Business from its inception in 2015 until 2023. She also appeared on Imus in the Morning prior to Imus' death in 2019, and was a weekly panelist for Cashin' In (she has won the Cashin' In Challenge three times, in 2013, 2014, 2015, defeating the other three panelists, all of whom are professional money managers). Dagen is regularly asked to provide her opinions about economic and political views on Fox News.  She had served as a panelist on Cavuto on Business, took over hosting Bulls and Bears in 2016 following predecessor Brenda Buttner's eventually fatal cancer diagnosis, and participates regularly in Outnumbered and The Five and Gutfeld!. She also worked for TheStreet.com.

In December 2022 Fox Business named McDowell co-host of a new show called The Bottom Line'' alongside Sean Duffy. The show debuted on January 23, 2023.

References

External links
Dagen McDowell, Fox Business

Fox Business people
1969 births
Living people
American investors
American people of Irish descent
Wake Forest University alumni
People from Brookneal, Virginia
Fox News people
Journalists from Virginia
American women television journalists
21st-century American women